Iyayi Believe Atiemwen (born 24 January 1996) is a Nigerian footballer who plays for Moldovan club Sheriff Tiraspol.

Club career

Atiemwen started his youth career at Bendel Insurance F.C. before moving to Kayseri Erciyesspor in 2016. After two years of unsuccessful spells in Turkey, he joined the Croatian second-tier club HNK Gorica where he made immediate impact and with whom he won the 2017–18 Croatian Second League.

Gorica gained promotion to the 2018–19 Croatian First League where they were labeled as the biggest surprise of the mid-season, finishing 5th. At the end of the year, Atiemwen was ranked third among the 2018 Prva HNL Player of the Year awards, behind Dani Olmo from Dinamo Zagreb and Héber from Rijeka.

On 22 January 2019, after spending a year at Gorica, Atiemwen signed a five-year contract with GNK Dinamo Zagreb.

On 15 February 2022, Atiemwen returned on loan to Gorica until the end of the season.

On 29 June 2022, Sheriff Tiraspol announced the signing of Atiemwen.

Personal life
In March 2019, accusations by two women were publicized, stating that Atiemwen had beaten them and attempted a rape in one case. One of the alleged victims announced she will officially press charges and Atiemwen was questioned by the police regarding the matter. Atiemwen himself denied the accusations, claiming he would never assault a woman, as his mother and three sisters would never forgive him.

References

1996 births
Living people
Nigerian footballers
Association football midfielders
Kayseri Erciyesspor footballers
Çaykur Rizespor footballers
Şanlıurfaspor footballers
Manisaspor footballers
HNK Gorica players
GNK Dinamo Zagreb players
NK Lokomotiva Zagreb players
AC Omonia players
TFF First League players
Süper Lig players
First Football League (Croatia) players
Croatian Football League players
Cypriot First Division players
Nigerian expatriate footballers
Expatriate footballers in Turkey
Expatriate footballers in Croatia
Expatriate footballers in Cyprus
Nigerian expatriate sportspeople in Turkey
Nigerian expatriate sportspeople in Croatia
Nigerian expatriate sportspeople in Cyprus